The Last Day of School Before Christmas is a 1975  drama film written and directed by  Gian Vittorio Baldi. It was screened at the 1975 Cannes Film Festival in the Directors' Fortnight section.

Plot

Cast 
Macha Méril as Egle
Lino Capolicchio as Erasmo
John Steiner as The Lieutenant
Luca Bonicalzi as Athos  
Delia Boccardo as Germana
Riccardo Cucciolla as Ambro
Lidia Biondi  as Prostitute
Laura Betti as Passenger
Giovanella Grifeo as Girl of Remembrance
Lou Castel as Partisan

See also
 List of Christmas films

References

External links

1970s Christmas drama films
Italian Christmas drama films
1975 drama films
1975 films
1970s Italian films